Archibald Fleming TD Order of St Sava (1863–c.1930) was a Scottish minister, military chaplain and religious author. He was Grand Chaplain to the Grand Lodge of Freemasons in Scotland.

Life

He was born on 27 December 1863, the eldest son of Rev Archibald Fleming, of Inchyra House, near Perth, Scotland. His father was minister of St Paul's Church in Perth.

He was educated at Perth Academy and then studied Divinity at University of Edinburgh (graduating M.A. in 1883). Like his father he became a Church of Scotland minister. Licensed by the Presbytery of Perth in 1887 he became assistant at St Cuthbert's Church, Edinburgh the same year. He was ordained to Newton on 25 September 1888; transferred to Tron Kirk in Edinburgh on 18 May 1897; acting chaplain 9th V.B. (Highlanders) the Royal Scots, 1898–1902, and London Scottish, 1903–1922. He was chaplain to the Lord High Commissioner, 1918–1920, the Monarch's representative at the annual, General Assembly of the Church of Scotland. Due to his work in Serbia during the First World War he was awarded the Serbian Order of St Sava in 1919.

He was editor of the church's magazine Life and Work from 1898 to 1902. He was succeeded as editor by John Ferrier. Thereafter, he became Minister of St Columba's Church, in Pont Street, London. He became Moderator of the Scottish Church in England in 1929.

Family

On 14 September 1898, he married Agnes Jane, daughter of Robert Cecil Williamson, Moray Place, Edinburgh. Their children were:

 Archibald Robert Cecil, B.A. (Oxon.), born 1899
 William Hamilton Dalrymple, B.A. (Cantab), born 1901
 Christian Isobel, born 1903
 Roberta Cecilia Helen, born 1909

Freemasonry
He was a Scottish Freemason having been Initiated in The Lodge of Holyrood House (St Luke's), No. 44, on 22 January 1896. He was the Grand Chaplain in the Grand Lodge of Scotland 1897-1899.[1] In 1899 he gave a lecture: ‘The Memory of King Robert Bruce.’ At this time he was resident at 9 Forres Street on the Moray Estate in Edinburgh.

References
Footnotes

Sources
Fasti Ecclesiae Scoticanae. Vol. VII, p. 471. By Hew Scott. 1928.
A History of the Masonic Lodge of Holyrood House (St. Lukes), No. 44 Holding of the Grand Lodge of Scotland, with Roll of Members, 1734-1934. Lindsay, Robert Strathern. Vol. II. T. and A. Constable at the University Press. 1935. p. 649.
Dictionary of Scottish Church History and Theology. Ed. Nigel M. de S. Cameron. 1993. p. 495.

External links
Fasti Ecclesiae Scoticanae
The Grand Lodge of Antient Free and Accepted Masons of Scotland

19th-century Ministers of the Church of Scotland
Scottish Freemasons
1863 births
Year of death missing
20th-century Ministers of the Church of Scotland
Alumni of the University of Edinburgh
Scottish magazine editors